Bantai is a village located in  Detroj-rampura taluka  Ahmedabad District in the state of Gujarat, India.

State Bank of india
Gujarati primary school 
Mahakali ma mandir
Khodiyar ma mandir
Hareshwar mahadev mandir
Government hospital

References 

Villages in Ahmedabad district
Settlements in Gujarat